Vladimir Alexanderovich Zharkov (born January 10, 1988) is a Russian professional ice hockey right winger. He is currently playing with Avangard Omsk of the Kontinental Hockey League (KHL). He has formerly playing in the National Hockey League with the  New Jersey Devils. Zharkov was selected by the Devils in the 3rd round (77th overall) of the 2006 NHL Entry Draft.

Playing career
Zharkov played four seasons within the New Jersey Devils organization. He scored his first NHL goal in the 2010–11 season, on January 17, 2011, against Kevin Poulin of the New York Islanders.

On July 3, 2012, Zharkov opted to return to his native Russia in accepting a three-year contract for a second spell with original club, HC CSKA Moscow of the KHL.

After six further seasons with CSKA, Zharkov left for a second time as a free agent, in agreeing to a two-year contract with Salavat Yulaev Ufa on 1 May 2018.

Zharkov played three seasons with Salavat Yulaev, before signing as a free agent to a two-year contract with newly crowned champions, Avangard Omsk, on 1 May 2021.

Career statistics

Regular season and playoffs

International

References

External links

1988 births
Living people
Albany Devils players
Avangard Omsk players
HC CSKA Moscow players
Lowell Devils players
New Jersey Devils draft picks
New Jersey Devils players
People from Elektrostal
Russian ice hockey right wingers
Salavat Yulaev Ufa players
Sportspeople from Moscow Oblast